Kryukov Canal is one of the Canals in central Saint Petersburg, Russia.

Name 
In 1738, the canal was named after the contractor Semyon Kryukov.

History 

The Kryukov Canal runs from the Admiralteysky Canal in the area of the present Labor Square and all the way to the Fontanka River.

Kryukov Canal was originally dug in 1719–1720 from the Neva River to the Moyka River for transport purposes. During the construction of part of the Annunciation Bridge, some water was piped through the present Labor Square. The water pipe has survived to this day.

Since 1830, the section from the Moyka to the Fontanka became called the Kryukov Canal. Granite embankments were built in 1801–1807.

Geographic information 
The length is 1.5 km, the width is up to 20 m, and the depth is 2 m. Together with the Admiralteysky Canal, the Kryukov Canal separates the New Holland Island from the Second Admiralteysky Island.

Bridges across the Kryukov Canal 

 Smezhny Bridge
 Staro-Nikolsky Bridge
 Kashin Bridge
 Torgovy Bridge
 Dekabristov Bridge
 Matveevsky Bridge

References

Further reading 
Горбачевич К. С., Хабло Е. П., Почему так названы? О происхождении названий улиц, площадей, островов, рек и мостов Ленинграда. — 3-е изд., испр. и доп. — Л.: Лениздат, 1985. — С. 448—449. — 511 с.
Горбачевич К. С., Хабло Е. П., Почему так названы? О происхождении названий улиц, площадей, островов, рек и мостов Санкт-Петербурга. — 4-е изд., перераб. — СПб.: Норинт, 1996. — С. 313. — 359 с. — .
Городские имена сегодня и вчера: Петербургская топонимика / сост. С. В. Алексеева, А. Г. Владимирович, А. Д. Ерофеев и др. — 2-е изд., перераб. и доп. — СПб.: Лик, 1997. — С. 62. — 288 с. — (Три века Северной Пальмиры). — .
По малым рекам и каналам Санкт-Петербурга. СПб.: Лениздат, 2001.
Зуев Г. И. Там, где Крюков канал… — М.-СПб.: Центрполиграф, МиМ-Дельта, 2007. — .

Admiralteysky District, Saint Petersburg
Canals of Saint Petersburg